Yuriy Volodymyrovych Yaskov (born 19 September 1980) is a former Ukrainian football player.

External links
 

1980 births
Living people
FC Chornomorets Odesa players
Ukrainian footballers
FC Kryvbas Kryvyi Rih players
Ukrainian Premier League players
FC Zenit Saint Petersburg players
Ukrainian expatriate footballers
Expatriate footballers in Russia
Russian Premier League players
FC Dnister Ovidiopol players
Footballers from Odesa
Association football forwards
FC Zenit-2 Saint Petersburg players